The Rural Municipality of Grandview No. 349 is a rural municipality (RM) in the Canadian province of Saskatchewan within Census Division No. 13 and  Division No. 6.

History 
The RM of Grandview No. 349 incorporated as a rural municipality on December 11, 1911.

Geography

Communities and localities 
The following urban municipalities are surrounded by the RM.

Villages
 Ruthilda

The following unincorporated communities are within the RM.

Localities
 Handel (dissolved as a village, January 1, 2007)
 Kelfield (dissolved as a village)

Demographics 

Attractions 
 Biggar Museum
 Dodsland & District Museum
 Plenty & District Museum
 Opuntia Lake National Migratory Bird Sanctuary

Government 
The RM of Grandview No. 349 is governed by an elected municipal council and an appointed administrator that meets on the first Wednesday after the third day of every month. The reeve of the RM is Steven Suter while its administrator is Shonda Toner. The RM's office is located in Kelfield.

Transportation 
 Saskatchewan Highway 51
 Saskatchewan Highway 657
 Saskatchewan Highway 659
 Biggar Airport

See also 
List of rural municipalities in Saskatchewan

References 

G

Division No. 13, Saskatchewan